"My Wish" is a song written by Jeffrey Steele and Steve Robson, and recorded by American country music group Rascal Flatts.  It was released in August 2006 as the third single from their album Me and My Gang.  It reached number one on the U.S. country charts in December 2006 and also peaked at number 28 on the Billboard Hot 100, making it one of their popular crossover singles. It peaked at number 13 on the Billboard Hot Adult Contemporary Tracks and at number 49 on the Billboard Pop 100. As of May 2016, the song has sold 2.927 million in the US. In August 2016, a re-recorded version of the song was released to celebrate the song's 10 year anniversary.

Remix versions
In 2007, the song was remixed and released on the Target bonus disc of Still Feels Good, and was later released alongside a remix of "What Hurts The Most" on a two-song EP entitled, The Hot Mixes.

In 2016, the song was re-recorded as a "10th Anniversary" release of the song.

Personnel
From Me and My Gang liner notes.
 Tom Bukovac - guitars
 Jay DeMarcus - bass guitar
 Paul Franklin - steel guitar
 Dann Huff - guitars
 Gary LeVox - lead vocals
 Chris McHugh - drums
 Gordon Mote - piano, keyboards
 Joe Don Rooney - guitars
 Jonathan Yudkin - fiddle, banjo

String section
 Charlie Bisharat, Roberto Cani, Mario DeLeon, Armen Garabedian, Peter Kent, Alyssa Park, Tereza Stanislav, Josefina Vergara, John Wittenberg - violins
 Suzie Katayama, Larry Corbett, Daniel Smith - cellos

Strings conducted by David Campbell.

Charts

Year-end charts

References

2006 singles
2006 songs
Rascal Flatts songs
Songs written by Jeffrey Steele
Song recordings produced by Dann Huff
Songs written by Steve Robson
Lyric Street Records singles